Doane Harrison (September 19, 1894 – November 11, 1968) was an American film editor whose career spanned four decades. For nearly twenty years, from 1935–54, he was a prolific editor of films for Paramount Pictures, including eleven films with director Mitchell Leisen. For twenty-five years, from 1941–1966, Harrison was editor, editorial supervisor or associate producer on all the films directed by Billy Wilder, who is now considered one of the great 20th-century filmmakers.

Early career
Born in Paw Paw, Michigan, Harrison began his career during the silent film era. The earliest phase of his career and his education don't appear to have been documented. In 1925–1926, he was credited as the editor for nine films starring Richard Talmadge, and produced by Richard Talmadge Productions.

By 1928, he was editing films produced by Pathé Exchange. In 1933 he edited his eleventh (and last) film starring Richard Talmadge, On Your Guard. By 1935, Harrison had joined Paramount Pictures, one of the major Hollywood studios. Harrison remained at Paramount for more than eighteen years. His first film there was Four Hours to Kill! (1935), which was directed by Mitchell Leisen; at Pathé Exchange, Leisen had been the art director and Harrison the editor on three films. Their notable director-editor collaboration ultimately stretched over twenty-three years and eleven films, including Hold Back the Dawn (1941), which received six Academy Award nominations, Easy Living (1937), Midnight (1939), and Remember the Night (1940).

Collaboration with Billy Wilder
Harrison is probably best remembered for his long association with Billy Wilder. As a new immigrant to the United States in the 1930s, Wilder had found work as a screenwriter for Paramount, where Harrison was also working as an editor. Wilder and Harrison both worked on Midnight in 1939, and again on Hold Back the Dawn in 1941. By 1942, Wilder had persuaded the management at Paramount to assign him as the director of the comedy The Major and the Minor; Wilder had previously directed just a single film in France. Wilder asked that Harrison be assigned as the film's editor. Wilder has been quoted as saying about this early assignment, "I worked with a very good cutter, Doane Harrison, from whom I learned a great deal. He was much more of a help to me than the cameraman. When I became a director from a writer my technical knowledge was very meagre." Sam Stagg has described their early collaboration, "In valuable early lessons, Harrison taught Wilder how to preplan each shot as part of a total editing scheme. The results: Time and money saved, and few protection shots required. (The term "protection shot", also called  coverage, refers to footage shot from various setups and angles that may be needed for editing a sequence in the cutting room.)"

The Major and the Minor was successful, and launched Wilder's directing career. Harrison worked on all the films directed by Wilder for the next 25 years, through The Fortune Cookie (1966); their unusually close collaboration involved Harrison in filming as well as editing.

Harrison was credited as editorial supervisor on the next several films that Wilder directed, through Sunset Boulevard (1950). Harrison was credited as an "editorial consultant" on Sabrina (1954), which was the last film at Paramount for Wilder and Harrison. After leaving Paramount, Harrison was an associate producer on eight, and production associate on two of Wilder's films, from The Seven Year Itch (1955) through The Fortune Cookie (1966).

Final cuts
Harrison's and Wilder's notable director-editor collaboration (as editor, editorial supervisor or advisor) had extended over ten films, from The Major and the Minor (1942) through Sabrina (1954). While he was working with Wilder, Harrison also edited more films by other directors; his final editing credit, for The Girl Most Likely (1958), was a reunion with director Mitchell Leisen. He acted as a consultant to Mike Nichols on Who's Afraid of Virginia Woolf? (1966), which was the first film Nichols directed.

Harrison was nominated three times for the Academy Award for Best Film Editing for three films directed by Wilder: Five Graves to Cairo (1943), The Lost Weekend (1945), and Sunset Boulevard (with Arthur P. Schmidt, 1950). Harrison died in 1968 in Riverside, California, aged 74.

Selected filmography
 A Prince of a King (1923)
 Jimmie's Millions (1925)
 Youth and Adventure (1925)
 The Mysterious Stranger (1925)
 Celebrity (1928)
 The Shady Lady (1928)
 The Sophomore (1929)
 His First Command (1929)
 Speed Madness (1932)

See also
List of film director and editor collaborations

References

External links
 

1894 births
1968 deaths
American film editors
Film producers from Michigan
People from Paw Paw, Michigan